Strawberry, California may refer to:
Strawberry, El Dorado County, California
Strawberry, Marin County, California
Strawberry, Tuolumne County, California